Shimon "Shemi" Zarhin (born 1961) is an Israeli novelist and film director. He was born in Tiberias and studied film at Tel Aviv University. His movies include titles such as Bonjour Monsieur Shlomi (2003), Aviva My Love (2006), and The World is Funny (2012). His first novel Some Day was a bestseller in Israel and has been translated into English by Yardenne Greenspan.

In March 2020 Helicon Music released the soundtrack for Aviva My Love

Awards
 for literature, awarded by the Municipality of Holon (2013)

References

Israeli writers
1961 births
Living people
Recipients of Prime Minister's Prize for Hebrew Literary Works